Thierry Wasser is a contemporary perfumer who as of 2008 was appointed as the in-house perfumer of Guerlain. Prior to this he worked under the fragrance firms Firmenich and Givaudan.

After attaining his Federal Diploma of Botany at age twenty, Wasser attended the Givaudan perfumery school and was promoted to perfumer at twenty four after a period of apprenticeship. He joined Firmenich in 1993. Here he collaborated extensively with Annick Ménardo in numerous fragrances.

His work includes collaborating with Jean Paul Guerlain in the creation of perfumes.

Works
Thierry Wasser has created many notable perfumes including:
Addict, Christian Dior
Fuel for Life for Her, Diesel
Quand Vient La Pluie, Guerlain
Hypnose, Lancôme
Idylle, Guerlain
Aqua Allegoria: Flora Nymphea, Guerlain
Man absolute, Jil Sander
La Petite Robe Noire, Guerlain
L'Homme Ideal, Guerlain

See also
Interview on swiss tv
Guerlain Homme L'eau

References

Year of birth missing (living people)
French perfumers
Living people